Eilema is a genus of moths in the subfamily Arctiinae. The genus was erected by Jacob Hübner in 1819.

Taxonomy
After a 2011 revision, all the species but one, E. caniola, have been moved to other genera.

The genera formerly included in Eilema are:
 Asiapistosia Dubatolov & Kishida, 2012
 Capissa Moore, 1878
 Collita Moore, 1878
 Dolgoma Moore, 1878
 Gandhara Moore, 1878
 Katha Moore, 1878
 Manulea Wallengren, 1863
 Muscula Koçak, 1991
 Prabhasa Moore, 1878
 Tarika Moore, 1878
 Wittia de Freina, 1980
 Zadadra Moore, 1878
 Zobida Birket-Smith, 1965

Species
 Eilema caniola Hübner, 1808

Eilema species

Eilema aistleitneri
Eilema albescens
Eilema albicosta
Eilema albidella
Eilema albidula
Eilema albostriatum
Eilema aldabrensis
Eilema alluaudi
Eilema amaura
Eilema amaurus
Eilema angustipennis
Eilema angustula
Eilema arculifera
Eilema ardens
Eilema argentea
Eilema arizana
Eilema arizona
Eilema aspersa
Eilema aspersoides
Eilema aurantioflava
Eilema aurantiotestacea
Eilema aurantisquamata
Eilema auriflua
Eilema aurora
Eilema barbata
Eilema basinota
Eilema bifasciata
Eilema bilati
Eilema bipartita
Eilema birkensmithi
Eilema bitincta
Eilema borbonica
Eilema brevivalva
Eilema brunnea
Eilema brunneotincta
Eilema bueana
Eilema caffrana
Eilema calamaria
Eilema caledonica
Eilema cana
Eilema carbunculosa
Eilema carnea
Eilema catalai
Eilema catenata
Eilema celsicola
Eilema chinchilla
Eilema chrysophlebs
Eilema cirrochroa
Eilema claudei
Eilema cohabitans
Eilema comma
Eilema comorensis
Eilema conisphora
Eilema conspicua
Eilema contempta
Eilema contorta
Eilema contradicta
Eilema costalba
Eilema costalboides
Eilema costimaculata
Eilema costipuncta
Eilema cramboides
Eilema crassicosta
Eilema creatoplaga
Eilema cretacea
Eilema cribroides
Eilema croceibasis
Eilema cuneata
Eilema curviplaga
Eilema danieli
Eilema debilissima
Eilema decaryi
Eilema degenerella
Eilema diliensis
Eilema discifera
Eilema distigma
Eilema distinguenda
Eilema dorsti
Eilema elegans
Eilema elophus
Eilema fasciata
Eilema fasciatella
Eilema fasciculosa
Eilema fibriata
Eilema fimbriata
Eilema flammea
Eilema flavibasis
Eilema flavicosta
Eilema fletcheri
Eilema flexistriata
Eilema formosa
Eilema formosicola
Eilema francki
Eilema fraterna
Eilema fulminans
Eilema fuscifrons
Eilema fuscipes
Eilema gainsfordi
Eilema gashorai
Eilema goniophora
Eilema goniophoroides
Eilema gracilipennis
Eilema griseoflava
Eilema griveaudi
Eilema heimi
Eilema heterogyna
Eilema homochroma
Eilema honei
Eilema hova
Eilema humbloti
Eilema hybrida
Eilema iluopsis
Eilema incertula
Eilema inconspicualis
Eilema inducta
Eilema infucata
Eilema inornata
Eilema insignis
Eilema instabilis
Eilema intermixta
Eilema interpositella
Eilema iuniformis
Eilema karenkona
Eilema khasiana
Eilema kingdoni
Eilema kuatunica
Eilema lachesis
Eilema lamprocraspis
Eilema laurenconi
Eilema leia
Eilema lemur
Eilema leopoldi
Eilema lepta
Eilema leucanicula
Eilema lividula
Eilema longpala
Eilema lutescens
Eilema mabillei
Eilema maculosa
Eilema margarita
Eilema marginata
Eilema marguerita
Eilema marioni
Eilema marwitziana
Eilema melanothorax
Eilema melasonea
Eilema mesosticta
Eilema minutissima
Eilema monochroma
Eilema nebra
Eilema nebuliferella
Eilema nebulosa
Eilema nicticans
Eilema nigripes
Eilema nigrociliata
Eilema nigrosparsa
Eilema niveata
Eilema nonagrioides
Eilema notifera
Eilema nubeculoides
Eilema ochroleuca
Eilema okiensis
Eilema pallidicosta
Eilema pauliani
Eilema paupercula
Eilema peperita
Eilema persephone
Eilema peyrierasi
Eilema phaeocraspis
Eilema phaeopera
Eilema phantasma
Eilema plana
Eilema plantei
Eilema polioplaga
Eilema prabhasana
Eilema proleuca
Eilema proleucodes
Eilema protuberans
Eilema pseudocretacea
Eilema pseudofasciata
Eilema pseudoluteola
Eilema pseudosimplex
Eilema pseudosoror
Eilema pulverea
Eilema pulvereola
Eilema pulverosa
Eilema punctifera
Eilema punctistriata
Eilema purpureotincta
Eilema pusilana
Eilema pustulata
Eilema quadrangula
Eilema quadrisignata
Eilema ranrunensis
Eilema ratonella
Eilema ratonis
Eilema recticosta
Eilema rubiginea
Eilema rubrescens
Eilema rufitincta
Eilema rufofasciata
Eilema sabulosula
Eilema saitonis
Eilema sakia
Eilema sandakana
Eilema sanguicosta
Eilema sarceola
Eilema semibrunnea
Eilema semperi
Eilema setiniformis
Eilema signata
Eilema similipuncta
Eilema simplex
Eilema simulatricula
Eilema sokotrensis
Eilema sordida
Eilema squalida
Eilema squamata
Eilema stevensii
Eilema strangulata
Eilema subcosteola
Eilema suspecta
Eilema taiwana
Eilema taiwanella
Eilema tardenota
Eilema tegudentata
Eilema terminalis
Eilema testaceoflava
Eilema tomponis
Eilema tonseana
Eilema transducta
Eilema trichopteroides
Eilema tricolor
Eilema tricolorana
Eilema trimacula
Eilema triplaiola
Eilema trispilota
Eilema tristis
Eilema umbrigera
Eilema umbripuncta
Eilema uniola
Eilema uniplaga
Eilema unipuncta
Eilema usuguronis
Eilema vanbraekeli
Eilema vicara
Eilema vicinula
Eilema viettei
Eilema violitincta
Eilema virgineola
Eilema voeltzkowi
Eilema xantholeuca

References

Ignatyev, N. N. & Witt, T. J. (2007). "A review of Eilema Hübner, 1819 of Russia and adjacent territories. Part 1. The Eilema griseola (Hübner, 1803) species group (Arctiidae: Lithosiinae)". Nota lepidopterologica. 30 (1): 25–43.
Inoue, H. (1988). "Three new species and some synonymic notes on the Arctiidae from Japan, Taiwan and Philippines". Tyô to Ga. 39 (2): 99-118.
Kühne, L. (2010) "Taxonomische Ergebnisse der bearbeitung der nachtfalterfauna des südlichen Afrikas (Lepidoptera: Noctuoidea)". Esperiana. Memoir 5: 433–456.
Lafontaine, J. D. & Schmidt, B. C. (2010). "Annotated check list of the Noctuoidea (Insecta, Lepidoptera) of North America north of Mexico". ZooKeys. 40: 1–239. .
Witt, T. J. & Ronkay, L. (2011). "Lymantriinae and Arctiinae - Including Phylogeny and Check List of the Quadrifid Noctuoidea of Europe". Noctuidae Europaeae. 13: 1–448.

 
Lithosiina
Moth genera